Tagami may refer to:

Places in Japan
 Tagami, Niigata, a town in Niigata prefecture
 Tagami Station, a train station in Gifu city
 Meitetsu Tagami Line, a former railway line in Gifu Prefecture; see Okayama Electric Tramway

People
, Japanese footballer
, Japanese baseball player
, Japanese poet

See also 
 Tegami (disambiguation), a similar-sounding word
 

Japanese-language surnames